Backe may refer to:

People
 Backe (surname)

Places
 Backe, Carmarthenshire, Wales
 Backe, Sweden
 Backë, a village in Albania
 Bačka or Baçkë, an area of the Pannonian plain divided between Serbia and Hungary

See also 
 Bache (disambiguation)
 Bakke (disambiguation)